Triple Divide Peak is a mountain on the boundary between Yosemite National Park and the Ansel Adams Wilderness in Madera County, California. Its name refers to the fact that it lies on the boundaries of three distinct watersheds, namely those of the Merced, South Fork Merced, and San Joaquin rivers.

Climate
According to the Köppen climate classification system, Triple Divide Peak is located in an alpine climate zone. Most weather fronts originate in the Pacific Ocean and travel east toward the Sierra Nevada mountains. As fronts approach, they are forced upward by the peaks (orographic lift), causing moisture in the form of rain or snowfall to drop onto the range.

See also
 
 Geology of the Yosemite area

References

Mountains of Yosemite National Park
Mountains of the Ansel Adams Wilderness
Mountains of Madera County, California
North American 3000 m summits
Mountains of Northern California
Sierra Nevada (United States)